Chandrika Prasad  was an Indian politician. He was elected to the Lok Sabha, the lower house of the Parliament of India from the Ballia constituency of Uttar Pradesh  as a member of the Indian National Congress.

References

External links
Official biographical sketch in Parliament of India website

1917 births
Indian National Congress politicians from Uttar Pradesh
Lok Sabha members from Uttar Pradesh
India MPs 1967–1970
India MPs 1971–1977
People from Ballia district
Year of death missing